The oilfish (Ruvettus pretiosus) is a species of snake mackerel fish with a cosmopolitan distribution in tropical and temperate oceans. It can grow to a length of  TL (nearly 10 feet) though most do not exceed  SL. It is currently the only known member of its genus.

The flesh of this fish is extremely oily and although edible, the oil actually consists of wax esters, which are not digested like edible oils. The flesh has an oil content of around 25%, and with serving sizes of several ounces and upwards commonplace, some people experience a laxative side effect from such a large amount of wax esters. Some consumers of large amounts of oilfish also experience abdominal cramps and vomiting.

Oilfish is pleasantly rich in taste and can be substantially cheaper than some other fish species, leading to some fish sellers intentionally mislabelling it as butterfish or even cod, despite the utter lack of relation. This leads the consumer to often eat larger servings, as they assume it is a fish with which they are familiar, and then may experience a laxative effect. Because of this, Japan and Italy have imposed an import ban on oilfish. Australia does not ban oilfish from being sold but recommends retailers and caterers to inform consumers about the potential risk associated with oilfish consumption. The US FDA has warned consumers about potential mislabeling of oilfish and any laxative or vomiting side effects that occur are at worst uncomfortable, but pose no health risk. Escolar, a relative of oilfish, also has high concentrations of wax esters and is often similarly mislabeled.

Hong Kong oilfish controversy
Hong Kong's ParknShop supermarket was selling oilfish labelled as "cod fish (oilfish)" in its stores. Consumers ate the fish, believing it to be cod, then suffered oily diarrhea (keriorrhea) as a result. The oilfish-labelling controversy was reported by a number of news and media organizations, such as TVB Newsmagazine.  A total of 14 complaints were filed against the supermarket chain, leading to an investigation by the Centre for Food Safety. ParknShop has denied responsibility, claiming the fish is safe for human consumption. Nonetheless, the chain has since stopped selling the fish product.

On 30 January 2007, the commercial attache from the Indonesian consulate in Hong Kong confirmed the export health certificate Mr Peter Johnston, ParknShop's Quality Food Safety and Regulatory Affairs General Manager, had used in its media conference several days earlier, was doctored. The attache explained its fisheries department, under a request from the Hong Kong importer, had changed the product name, by including "Cod Fish" alongside its scientific name, on the certificate.

As a result of the ParknShop-oilfish incident, Centre for Food Safety in Hong Kong published new  guidelines on the proper labelling of oilfish to consumers, such that oilfish species Ruvettus pretiosus and Lepidocybium flavobrunneum should not be labelled as "cod". ParknShop was also fined HKD 45,000 after pleading guilty to 9 counts of misrepresentation of products.

The Canadian Broadcasting Corporation reported in 2007 on several cases in Canada where mislabelled oilfish was sold at Chinese supermarkets.

See also
Escolar

References

Gempylidae
Cosmopolitan fish
Taxa named by Anastasio Cocco
Fish described in 1833